Wilkey Creek is a stream in Cedar and Vernon Counties in the U.S. state of Missouri. It is a tributary of Horse Creek.

Wilkey Creek has the name of one Mr. Wilkey, a pioneer citizen.

See also
List of rivers of Missouri

References

Rivers of Cedar County, Missouri
Rivers of Vernon County, Missouri
Rivers of Missouri